The Meuse–Rhine Euroregion is a Euroregion created in 1976, with judicial status achieved in 1991. It comprises 11.000 km2 and has around 3.9 million inhabitants around the city-corridor of Aachen–Maastricht–Hasselt–Liège. The seat of the region has been in Eupen, Belgium since 1 January 2007. Within a wider context, the region is part of what is called the Blue Banana European urbanisation corridor.

Governmental areas 

The Meuse–Rhine Euregion comprises:

 The western part of the governmental Region of Cologne in Germany including the city of Aachen, the District of Aachen, the District of Düren, the District of Euskirchen and the District of Heinsberg, collectively referred to as the Region of Aachen.
 The German-speaking Community of Belgium; the seat of the Euroregion is located in its capital Eupen.
 The Belgian Liège Province.
 The Belgian Limburg Province.
 The southern part of the Dutch Province of Limburg, with the northern point of the Meuse–Rhine Euroregion being the city of Roermond. The Meuse–Rhine Euroregion includes the provincial capital city of Maastricht as well as the co-operative region Parkstad Limburg surrounding the city of Heerlen.

Languages 
The official languages of the three countries involved in the Euregion are Dutch (in Belgium and the Netherlands), French (in Belgium) and German (in Belgium and Germany). Regional languages are also spoken namely Limburgish (which is recognised as a regional language in Dutch Limburg), Ripuarian and Walloon. The intra-cultural aspect of the Limburgish and Ripuarian is that they are spoken on both sides of the border. Limburgish, although only recognised as such in The Netherlands, is also spoken in Belgian Limburg and North Rhine-Westphalia. Ripuarian is also spoken on both sides of the Dutch–German border, but with the extra trait of having the same variant spoken on both sides of the border.

In daily life, one rarely makes a distinction between Limburgish and Ripuarian. The latter language hardly enjoys any recognition by people who speak it. The dialects of both linguistic groups change gradually from village to village, and the overlap from Limburgish dialects to Ripuarian dialects is hard to pin-point. Moreover, Ripuarian-speakers in Dutch Limburg generally consider their dialects to be part of the Limburgish language, not the Ripuarian one. On the other hand, Ripuarian-speakers on the German side of the border rarely use the term "Ripuarian" and generally refer to it as Plat(t), a term that is also used by Limburgish-speakers for their own mother-tongue.

See also 
 EUREGIO
 Ems Dollart Region

External links 
Meuse-Rhine Euroregion site 

Euroregions
Geography of Liège Province
Geography of Limburg (Belgium)
Geography of North Rhine-Westphalia
Regions of Flanders
Regions of Limburg (Netherlands)
Regions of Wallonia
South Limburg (Netherlands)